Ferial Govashiri (born 1982/1983) is an Iranian-American political aide who served as the Personal Secretary to U.S. President Barack Obama at the White House from May 2014 through January 20, 2017. Govashiri is currently Chief of Staff to the Chief Content Officer at Netflix.

Beginning in the summer of 2007, she worked on then-Senator Barack Obama's presidential campaign in his Chicago headquarters in the department of Scheduling and Advance. Govashiri went on to work in the White House after the election.

For the first five years of the Obama administration, Govashiri worked on the National Security Council (NSC) staff, first as a senior advisor to Ben Rhodes, the Deputy National Security Advisor and then as the Senior Advisor to the Chief of Staff and the Director of Visits at the NSC. She helped plan the President's foreign trips as well as foreign leaders' visits to the White House. She is fluent in English and Persian.  She is an active member of the Iranian American Women Foundation and has spoken at conferences on their behalf.

References

American politicians of Iranian descent
California Democrats
Living people
Obama administration personnel
American people of Iranian descent
Personal secretaries to the President of the United States
Place of birth missing (living people)
University of California, Irvine alumni
Year of birth missing (living people)